Molson Lake is a lake in Northern Region, Manitoba, Canada and the source of the Hayes River.

The primary inflows are the Molson River and Keepeewiskawakun River at the south, and the primary outflow is the Hayes River at the north of the lake, which heads towards Robinson Lake.

Molson Lake Airport is on the north shore of the lake at the west end.

Tributaries
Counterclockwise from the Hayes River outlet
Panepuyew Creek
Paimusk Creek
Keepeewiskawakun River
Molson River

See also
List of lakes of Manitoba

References

Notes

Lakes of Northern Manitoba